Cercocarpus montanus  is a North American species of shrub or small tree in the family Rosaceae native to northern Mexico and the western United States. It is known by the common names alder-leaf mountain-mahogany, alder-leaf cercocarpus, and true mountain-mahogany. The variety argenteus is commonly known as silverleaf mountain-mahogany.

Distribution
Cercocarpus montanus is common in chaparral scrub, on mesas, the lower foothills of the Rocky Mountains, and the Great Plains in the United States. Its range extends from Montana, Idaho, and South Dakota south as far as Sonora, Durango, and Nuevo León.

Description and ecology
Cercocarpus montanus often remains under  in height because of browsing by elk and deer, but can reach . It has thin and smooth bark. The species is considered to be long lived.

It is also eaten by yellow-haired porcupine.

References

External links

 Discover Life

montanus
Flora of the Western United States
Flora of Mexico
Plants described in 1832
Taxa named by Constantine Samuel Rafinesque
Flora without expected TNC conservation status